Bauru Atlético Clube, commonly known as Bauru, was a Brazilian football club based in Bauru, São Paulo.

History
The club was founded on 1 May 1919, as Luzitana Futebol Clube. Bauru won the {Campeonato Paulista do Interior de Futebol in 1946 when Pelé's father Dondinho was part of the winning squad. Pelé started his career playing for Bauru Youth. After Pelé left the club, Bauru folded in the 1960s.

Stadium
Bauru Atlético Clube played their home games at Arena Lusitana.

References

Association football clubs established in 1919
Defunct football clubs in São Paulo (state)
1919 establishments in Brazil
1960s disestablishments in Brazil